Edwin Martin Parry (born 14 March 1935, in Yorkshire) is a British former sailor who competed in the 1964 Summer Olympics where his team finished 4th in the Dragon class competition.

References

1935 births
Living people
British male sailors (sport)
Olympic sailors of Great Britain
Sailors at the 1964 Summer Olympics – Dragon